Yagara or Yagera may refer to:

Yagara people, an ethnic group of Australia
Yagara language, formerly spoken by them

See also 
 Kenichi Yagara, Japanese football player
 Yagura (disambiguation)